Jamie Shaul (born 1 July 1992) is an English professional rugby league footballer who plays as a  for Wakefield Trinity, on loan from Hull F.C. in the Super League and England national rugby league team. 

Shaul spent time on loan at the York City Knights in the Kingstone Press Championship in 2013.

Background
Shaul was born in Kingston upon Hull, East Riding of Yorkshire, England.

Playing career
An ex-brick layer, he was Hull's U20 player of the year in 2012 and has been ever present since August 2013. In the 2014 season, he has made 14 appearances and scored 10 tries.

After making a strong start to his Hull F.C. career in 2013, he was handed a new 5-year contract.  Shaul was Hull's starting full-back in the teams Challenge Cup Final defeat by Wigan Warriors

In 2016, Shaul played an important part in Hull's successful campaign.  He scored the winning try in the team's 2016 Challenge Cup Final win over the Warrington Wolves, with a narrow 12-10 score at Wembley Stadium.

As a result of his successful season, Shaul was included in the Super League Dream Team along with 5 of his teammates.

In 2017, Shaul once again won the Challenge Cup as Hull FC defeated Wigan Warriors by a score of 18-14 to win their second cup in as many years, the first time Hull have done this.

International career
In July 2018 he was selected in the England Knights Performance squad.

In 2018 he was selected for England against France at the Leigh Sports Village.

Honours

Club
Challenge Cup: (2) 2016, 2017
Runner-up: (1) 2013

Individual
Super League Dream Team: (1) 2016

References

External links
Hull FC profile
SL profile

1992 births
Living people
England Knights national rugby league team players
England national rugby league team players
English rugby league players
Hull F.C. players
Rugby league fullbacks
Rugby league players from Kingston upon Hull
Wakefield Trinity players
York City Knights players